Two cities submitted bids to host the 2014 Asian Games that were recognized by the Olympic Council of Asia (OCA). OCA selected Incheon, South Korea over New Delhi, India as the host for 17th Asian Games on 17 April 2007, at its 26th General Assembly held in Kuwait City, Kuwait by a vote of 32 to 13. The host city election was originally scheduled to be held during the 25th OCA General Assembly in Doha, Qatar.

Bidding process 

 Submission of letters of intent (31 March 2005)
 Deadline for the submission of bids (30 June 2005)
 OCA Evaluation Committee visit to New Delhi (9–11 November 2006)
 OCA Evaluation Committee visit to Incheon (12–14 November 2006)
 Election of the host city during the 26th OCA General Assembly at the Marriott Hotel in Kuwait City, Kuwait (17 April 2007)

Candidate cities

Showed preliminary interest
Two countries expressed interest in bidding and submitted letter of intent, but failed to submit bids when applications were due.

References

External links
 Incheon Bid Website (archived)

2014 Asian Games
Asian Games bids
2007 in Kuwait
April 2007 events in Asia